A. Stuart Albery was a British political figure active in the Socialist movement during the first decade of the twentieth century.

Albery was a member of the Social Democratic Federation (SDF), and later of the May 1904 Provisional Committee,  which led to the founding in June of the Socialist Party of Great Britain. An early public speaker and Executive Committee member for the Party, he withdrew after a few months and by 1906 was back in the SDF. Along with Socialist Standard writer Alec Gray, he is known to have been a member of the Independent Labour Party.

At the 1922 London County Council election, Albery stood unsuccessfully for the Labour Party in Clapham.

References

Socialist Party of Great Britain 1904–1913 membership register
Justice
Socialist Standard, July 1906

Year of death missing
Socialist Party of Great Britain members
Social Democratic Federation members
Independent Labour Party politicians
British Marxists
Year of birth missing
Place of birth missing
Place of death missing